Réda Johnson (born 21 March 1988) is a professional footballer who last played as a defender for National League club Dover Athletic where he held the role of player-coach. He previously played for Sheffield Wednesday, Gueugnon, Amiens, Plymouth Argyle and Coventry City. Born in France, he represented the Benin national team.

Club career
Born in Marseille, Johnson began his career as a professional footballer in 2005 with Gueugnon. He spent two years with the club but didn't make an appearance in Ligue 2 before joining Amiens. He made his debut on 24 August 2007 and went on to make a further eleven appearances in all competitions during the 2007–08 season. He was restricted to eight league appearances the following season as Amiens were relegated to Championnat National. New manager Serge Romano identified Johnson as one of the club's more saleable assets and agreed that he could leave if a suitable offer materialised. He joined Scottish club Aberdeen on trial in July 2009, and looked set to join them permanently after impressing their manager Mark McGhee.

He then played in a pre-season game for English club Plymouth Argyle, and joined permanently for an undisclosed fee on a three-year contract a few days later. He made his debut on 22 August 2009, and made a further 24 appearances in his first season with the club. He won earned many plaudits for his performances but couldn't prevent Argyle from being relegated. He scored his first senior goal in September 2010 against Colchester United, while captaining the team in the absence of Carl Fletcher. Johnson was sold to Sheffield Wednesday in January 2011 for an undisclosed fee. He scored on his league debut to rescue a point for his new club against Charlton Athletic.

It was announced on 5 July 2014 that Johnson had signed for Coventry City on a one-year contract, with a negotiation clause for a further year. He scored twice on his debut for Coventry, in a 3–2 defeat to Bradford City.

On 5 February 2020, Eastleigh Football Club released a statement that the contract with Reda had been terminated with immediate effect.

On 24 June 2021, Johnson was announced to have joined Dover Athletic in the role of player-coach. Johnson was released by the club after one season following relegation.

International career
On 11 February 2009, Johnson made his debut for Benin in a friendly against Algeria.

Personal life
On 5 January 2011, Johnson appeared in court charged with false imprisonment of a woman whilst at the house of an unnamed Blackburn Rovers player. Both Sheffield Wednesday and Plymouth Argyle, his club at the time of the incident, claimed to have no knowledge of the incident until the court appearance.

The case was dropped due to lack of evidence at his return to court on 7 April 2011, with Johnson later talking of his innocence and relief that his name had been cleared.

He went on to win the PFA Player in the Community award in 2014.

Career statistics

Honours
Sheffield Wednesday
 Football League One runner-up: 2011–12

References

External links

1988 births
Living people
Footballers from Marseille
Citizens of Benin through descent
Beninese footballers
Benin international footballers
French footballers
Association football defenders
FC Gueugnon players
Amiens SC players
Plymouth Argyle F.C. players
Sheffield Wednesday F.C. players
Coventry City F.C. players
Eastleigh F.C. players
Dover Athletic F.C. players
Ligue 2 players
English Football League players
National League (English football) players
2010 Africa Cup of Nations players
Beninese expatriate footballers
French expatriate footballers
Expatriate footballers in England
Beninese expatriate sportspeople in England
French expatriate sportspeople in England
French sportspeople of Beninese descent
Association football coaches
Black French sportspeople